Chadwela  is a village development committee in Sunsari District in the Kosi Zone of south-eastern Nepal. At the time of the 1991 Nepal census it had a population of 5132 people living in 926 individual households.

References

Populated places in Sunsari District